is a legendary Japanese mermaid or merman with a bird-beak like mouth and three legs or tail-fins, who allegedly emerges from the sea, prophesies either an abundant harvest or an epidemic, and instructed people to make copies of its likeness to defend against illness.

This information was typically disseminated in the form of illustrated woodblock print bulletins (kawaraban) or pamphlets (surimono) or hand-drawn copies. The amabie was depicted on a print marked with an 1846 date. Attestation to the amabiko predating amabie had not been known until the discovery of a hand-painted leaflet dated 1844.

There are also other similar  that are not classed within the amabie/amabiko group, e.g.,the
.

Legend 
According to legend, an amabie appeared in Higo Province (Kumamoto Prefecture), around the middle of the fourth month, in the year Kōka-3 (mid-May 1846) in the Edo period. A glowing object had been spotted in the sea, almost on a nightly basis. The town's official went to the coast to investigate and witnessed the amabie. According to the sketch made by this official, it had long hair, a mouth like bird's bill, was covered in scales from the neck down and three-legged. Addressing the official, it identified itself as an amabie and told him that it lived in the open sea. It went on to deliver a prophecy: "Good harvest will continue for six years from the current year; if disease spreads, draw a picture of me and show the picture of me to those who fall ill." Afterward, it returned to the sea.

Amabiko group 

There is only one unique record of an amabie, whose meaning is uncertain. It has been conjectured that this amabie was simply a miscopying of "amabiko", a yōkai creature that can be considered identical. Like the amabie, the amabiko is a three-legged or multi-legged prophesizing creature which prescribes the display of its artistic likeness to defend against sickness or death. However, the appearance of the amabie is said to be rather mermaid-like (the three-leggedness allegedly stemming from a mermaid type called ), and for this reason one researcher concludes there is not enough of a close resemblance in physical appearance between the two.

Name variations 
There are a dozen or more attestations of amabiko or amahiko (var. ,) extant (counting the amabie), with the copies dated 1843 (Tenpō 14) perhaps being the oldest.

Locality of appearances 

Beyond those clustered in the south, two describe appearances in Echigo Province in the north.

The two oldest accounts (1844, 1846) do not closely specify the locations, but several accounts name specific village or counties (gun) that turn out to be nonexistent fictitious place names.

Physical characteristics 

The accompanying caption texts describes some as glowing (at night) or having ape-like voices, but description of physical appearance is rather scanty. The newspapers and commentators however provide iconographic analysis of the pictorials (hand-painted and prints).

The majority of pictorial represent the amabiko/amabie as 3-legged (or odd-number legged), with a couple cases rather like an ordinary quadruped.

Torso-less ape-like version
An , whose appearance in Echigo Province is documented on a leaflet dated 1844 (Tenpō 15).

The hand-copied pamphlet illustration depicts a creature rather like an ape with three legs, the legs seemingly projecting directly from the head (without any neck or torso in-between). The body and face are covered profusely with short hair, except for it being bald-headed. The eyes and ears are human-like, with a pouty or protruding mouth. The creature appeared in the year 1844 and predicted doom to 70% of the Japanese population that year, which could be averted with its picture-amulet.

Amahiko-no-mikoto
The crude newspaper illustration depicts a daruma doll-like or ape-like, hairless-looking four-legged creature. This example stands out since it was emerged not in the ocean but in a wet rice field. Also, the addition of the imperial/divine title of "-mikoto" has been noted by one researcher as resembling the name of one of the Amatsukami or "Heavenly Deities" of ancient Japan.

This creature in the crude drawing is said to resemble a daruma doll or an ape.

Ape-voiced

There are at least three examples of the amabiko[?] crying like apes.

This document has a terminus post quem of 1871 (Meiji 4) or later, The painting is said to depict a quadruped, with extremely close similarity in form to the mikoto (ape- or daruma doll-like) by commentators. However, the  that cried like an ape (newspaper piece) is reported to have been drawn as a "three-legged monster".

A tangential point of interest is that this text transcribed in the newspaper refers to "we amahiko who dwell in the sea", suggesting there are multiple numbers of the creature.

Glowing
The glowing is an attribute common to other examples, such as the amabie and  reported in the Nagano Shinbun.

 was also purportedly seen glowing at night in the offing of the Western Sea, during the Tenpō era (1830–1844), and illustrations were brought for sale at 5 sen apiece to -kanamachi village, Tokyo, as reported in another newspaper, dated 20 October 1881. This creature allegedly predicted global-scale doom thirty-odd years ahead, conveniently coinciding with the time the peddlers were selling them, prompting researcher Eishun Nagano to comment that while the text may or may not have been genuinely composed in the Edo Period, the illustrations were probably contemporary, though he guesses that the merchandise was surimono woodblock print. The creature also professed to serve the heavenly Tenbu or Deva divinities (of Buddhism), even though he is presumably sea-dwelling.

Old man or monk
The  on a surimono print, which purportedly appeared in Hyūga Province, The illustration here resembles an old man with bird-like body and nine legs.

Similar yōkai 

In Japanese folklore or popular imagination, there are also other similar yōkai that follow the pattern of predicting doom and instructing humans to copy or view its image, but lie outside the classification of amabie/amabiko according to a noted researcher. These are referred to generically as "other" .

The yamawarawa in the folklore of Amakusa is believed to haunt the mountains. Although neither of these last two emerge from sea, other similarities such as prophesying and three-leggedness indicate some sort of interrelationship.

A tradition in the West ascribes every creature of the sea with the ability to foretell the future, and there is no scarcity of European legends about merfolk bringing prophecy. For this reason, the amabie is considered to be a type of mermaid, in some quarters. But since the amabie is credited with the ability to repel pestilence as well, it should be considered as more of a deity according to some.

COVID-19 

During the COVID-19 pandemic in Japan, amabie became a popular topic on Twitter in Japan. Manga artists (e.g. Chica Umino, Mari Okazaki and Toshinao Aoki) published their cartoon versions of amabie on social networks. The Twitter account of Orochi Do, an art shop specializing in hanging scrolls of yōkai, is said to have been the first, tweeting "a new coronavirus countermeasure" in late February 2020. A twitter bot account (amabie14) has been collecting images of amabie since March 2020. This trend was noticed by scholars.

See also 
 Ningyo
 Fiji mermaid
 Jenny Haniver
 Cradleboard, which some amabie resemble

Footnotes

Explanatory notes

Citations

Bibliography 

 
 
 
 

Yōkai
Mermaids
Japanese folklore
Prophecy
Internet memes
COVID-19 pandemic in Japan